Saadi,  Sadī, Sadi, or SADI may refer to:

People
 Sadi (name)
 Saadi Shirazi, a Persian poet
 Saadi dynasty, a dynasty of Morocco

Places
 Sədi, village in Azerbaijan
 Sadi, East Azerbaijan, a village in Iran
 Sadi, Marand, a village in Iran
 Sadi, Kerman, a village in Iran
 Sadi, Khuzestan, a village in Iran
 Sadi, Nepal

Science, Medicine, and Technology
 SADI, Semantic Automated Discovery and Integration
 SADI-S, a type of bariatric surgery

See also
 Sadi Moma, Bulgarian folk song
 Biswin Sadi, Urdu language literary magazine in India
 Saadia
 Saudi (disambiguation)